Electronic Tragedy: Enola, stylized as , is the eleventh studio album by P-Model and the second by its "revised" lineup.

Background
In October 1996, P-Model started their project , codenamed  "Unfix", a 9-part venture where each member (or "branch") would work in projects either independently of the band or with other members in different formations, culminating with all branches merging again. The members were able to enact Unfixes #0, #1, #2, #4 and #6 successfully, with #1 being the band's enhanced maxi single "Rocket Shoot". The project reached setbacks when Susumu Hirasawa was unable to come to Unfix #3, an all-night event which was supposed to have participation from every member, due to sudden illness and when Unfix #5, also a live event, was cancelled. The original plan was abandoned for good with the departure of drummer Wataru Kamiryo from the band, which made the end goal of merging all branches impossible. That led to Hirasawa to reconceptualize the project.

The reworked concept was centered around a story, which unfolded through maxi singles, the album, HTML and video files included in those releases, live shows, that year's World Inspection Tour and the internet, which the band used to post reports and set forth tasks for concertgoers through its official bulletin board system; all of this made it essentially like one of Hirasawa's Interactive Lives, but done with P-Model.

The story revolves around LAYER-GREEN, a three-dimensional "information sphere" representation of the internet, and was made to have people understand the feeling of being in an internet community, and to maybe make them want to buy a computer. Shortly after the project's end, Hirasawa felt that it wasn't as conceptually realized as his Interactive Lives, excessively enthusiastic and wasn't as adamant about its points anymore.

The idea of LAYER-GREEN was inspired by a vacation Hirasawa took in Bali in late 1996, amazed by the fractal patterns that he saw on a temple and its nearby jungle, as well as gamelan music, feeling that Bali was techno music itself. This Asian inspiration also manifested in the music made for the album.

Composition and production
Electronic Tragedy/〜ENOLA is the only P-Model album where less than half of its songs were written by Hirasawa, containing a "balanced" number of tracks for each member, sequenced to cycle through all of them. Kamiryo had prepared material for the album as well, and had he not left the band, there would have been less Hirasawa compositions than it ended up with. Since he wasn't the main creative force, Hirasawa did not have to consciously change his style for the album as a whole to have a different sound.

Hajime Fukuma, who was not content with making only "bonus material" following the release of "Rocket Shoot", sought to actively participate on the project. Some of his contributions aimed for a P-Model feel, but he also tried to include arrangement touches that the other members either would not use or opposed using on their own material and easy to understand technopop songs.

For Electronic Tragedy/〜ENOLA and its two preceding maxi singles, P-Model significantly digitized its workflow. Every member had a Roland VS-880 hard disk recorder, so almost all electronics were recorded on their home studios. They communicated online about their songs, sending low-quality RealAudio files of their demos to each other for review, changing aspects as discussion went on. They later convened in Thai studios to listen to the others' songs in high-quality and to record vocals. After recording was finished, they then went to a Tokyo studio to transfer their recordings to tape and mixdown.

For the inclusion of enhanced material, the group faced issues with the way the music industry was and undertook a big financial risk doing it. Extra staff was brought in create and ship the content. Nippon Columbia would not give them royalties for any non-music content, and could not think of packaging in any terms other than music packaging, so the band incurred extra costs trying to adapt to the different format.

Track listing

Personnel
Susumu Hirasawa - Vocals, Electric guitar, Synthesizers, Sampler, Amiga, Sequencer, Programming
Hajime Fukuma - System-1, Lead vocals on "BOGY", Backing vocals
Kenji Konishi - System-2, Lead vocals on "ENN", Backing vocals
Natthacha Yodsoongnern - Narration on "BOGY"
Masanori Chinzei - Mixing and Recording Engineer
Akinori Yoshino - Mixing (maxi-singles only) and Recording Engineer
Hideki Namai - Photography
Toshiyuki Akimoto - Direction

Release history

References

Bibliography

 .

External links
 Electronic Tragedy/〜ENOLA at NO ROOM - The official site of Susumu Hirasawa (P-MODEL)
 
 Electronic Tragedy/〜ENOLA +6 at iTunes Japan
 Electronic Tragedy/〜ENOLA +6 at amazon.co.jp

1997 albums
Japanese-language albums
P-Model albums
Nippon Columbia albums